Oscar II was the King of Sweden and Norway.

Oscar II may also refer to:

Oscar-class submarine, a series of nuclear-powered cruise missile submarines

HSwMS Oscar II, a coastal defence ship

OSCAR 2, an amateur radio satellite
Oscar II, commonly known as the Peace Ship, used by Henry Ford in his 1915 peace mission

Oscar II